Gleidson is a given name. It may refer to:

 Gleidson Souza (born 1984), Brazilian football left-back
 Gleidson Saturnino (born 1997), Brazilian futsal defender

See also
 Gleydson (disambiguation)
 Glaydson
 Gleison (disambiguation)